"Next to You" is the third single from Houston rapper Mike Jones second studio album, The Voice. It was produced by J.R. Rotem and features uncredited background vocals from R&B singer Nae Nae.

It was first released on Mike Jones' MySpace profile, and was then released on Amazon and iTunes on December 2, 2008.

Music video
Mr. Boomtown directed the music video for the song. The girl in the song is often confused with American-singer/actress Ashanti, however it is not. Mike Jones had stated that it is a singer signed to his label and her name is Nae Nae. He also said she is in the music video to show the fans that it is not Ashanti.

Charts

References

2008 singles
2009 singles
Mike Jones (rapper) songs
Warner Records singles
Song recordings produced by J. R. Rotem
2008 songs
Songs written by J. R. Rotem
Songs written by Mike Jones (rapper)